The Senai Airport Mosque is a main mosque in Senai International Airport in Senai, Kulai District, Johor, Malaysia. It was opened in 2003. It is also used as an international mosque for tourist who arrived and depart from/to Senai Airport. It is also a public mosque for Muslims from Kampung Maju Jaya and townships from Senai.

See also
 Islam in Malaysia

2003 establishments in Malaysia
Kulai District
Mosques completed in 2003
Mosques in Johor
Mosque buildings with domes